Louco por Elas is a Brazilian television sitcom that premiered on Rede Globo on March 13, 2012. It stars Eduardo Moscovis, Deborah Secco, Glória Menezes, Laura Barreto, and Luisa Arraes. The second season aired between October 30, 2012 and December 18, 2012 with 8 episodes produced.

The final season premiered on January 22, 2013 and ended on June 25, 2013.

Series overview

Episodes

Season 1 (2012)

Season 2 (2012)

Season 3 (2013)

References

External links 
 

Brazilian television series
Brazilian television-related lists